is a railway station in the city of Utsunomiya, Tochigi, Japan, operated by the private railway operator Tobu Railway. The station is numbered "TN-39".

Lines

Station layout
The station consists of one island platform connected to the station building by a level crossing.

Platforms

Adjacent stations

History
It was renamed to its present name on 15 December 1932.

From 17 March 2012, station numbering was introduced on all Tobu lines, with Minami-Utsunomiya Station becoming "TN-39".

Passenger statistics
In fiscal 2019, the station was used by an average of 1205 passengers daily (boarding passengers only).

Surrounding area
Utsunomiya Culture Center
Utsnomiya Public Library

See also
 List of railway stations in Japan

References

External links

  

Railway stations in Tochigi Prefecture
Stations of Tobu Railway
Railway stations in Japan opened in 1932
Tobu Utsunomiya Line
Utsunomiya